Anwer Sultan (born 19 July 1962) is an Indian sport shooter. He competed at the 2000 Summer Olympics in Sydney, in the men's trap.

References

1962 births
Living people
Indian male sport shooters
Olympic shooters of India
Shooters at the 2000 Summer Olympics
Commonwealth Games medallists in shooting
Commonwealth Games bronze medallists for India
Asian Games medalists in shooting
Asian Games silver medalists for India
Shooters at the 2002 Asian Games
Shooters at the 2006 Asian Games
Medalists at the 2002 Asian Games
Medalists at the 2006 Asian Games
Shooters at the 2002 Commonwealth Games
Recipients of the Arjuna Award
21st-century Indian people
Medallists at the 2002 Commonwealth Games